The A83 autoroute is a motorway in France.  It is in the departments of Pays-de-la-Loire and Poitou-Charentes operated by ASF.  It connects Nantes to Niort via Fontenay-le-Comte.  The motorway has a junction with the A10 at Niort which gives access to the north and to Bordeaux connection.  The A83 forms part of the Autoroute des Estuaires.  The total length is 152.5 km.  It is also part of the European route E3.

Opposition 
The A83 was only finally opened in 2001 with the opening of the section between Oulmes and Niort.  This last part of the route put an end to a long debate since 1987.  The A83 was originally to join the A10 by circumventing Niort to the south passing close to Coulon and Magné.  This route was more direct but crossed the Poitevin Marsh (Marais Poitevin) – disturbing fauna, flora, and the landscapes of this wet marshland.

A83 was opened between Nantes and Oulmes while a more environmentally friendly route was sought.   The southern layout close to Niort had two problems wet marsh and the urbanized district of Saint-Liguaire.  Finally, in 1992, a longer route to the north of Niort was selected.  This was supported by the Local authority as it served more of its district.  The last 34.4 km between Oulmes and Niort were opened by Ségolène Royal in 2001, then deputy of Deux-Sèvres.  She had had to campaign to ensure the marshland is preserved.  Arbitration had been provided by President François Mitterrand.

Junctions  

 Exchange A83-RN901 Junction with the Périphérique de Nantes (Porte des Sorinières) and the N801.     
 Service Area: La Grassinière     
 01 (D718) Towns served: Junction with the RD718    
 02 (La Cour Neuve) Towns served: La Cour Neuve    
 Péage du Bignon     
 Rest Area: Remouillé     
 04 (Montaigu) Towns served: Montaigu     
 Service Area: Les Brouzils/Chavagnes-en-Paillers     
 Exchange A83-A87 Junction with the A87     
 05 (Les Essarts-Les Herbiers) Towns served: Les Herbiers    
 Rest Area: Grissay/Ste Florence     
 06 (Bournezau-Chantonnay) Towns served: Bournezau      
 Service Area: Vendée     
 07 (Luçon-Ste Hermine) Towns served: Luçon    
 Péage du Fontenay-le-Comte     
 Rest Area: Auzay-Ouest     
 Rest Area: Auzay-Est     
 08 (Fontenay-le-Comte) Towns served: Fontenay-le-Comte    
 09 (Niort-Ouest) Towns served: niort    
 Service Area: La Chateaudrie/La Canepetière     
 10 (Niort-Nord) Towns served: Niort    
 11 (Niort-Est) Towns served: niort    
 Exchange A10-A83 Junction with the A10 to Bordeaux and Paris.

A831 
The autoroute aims to shorten the journey from Nantes to Bordeaux which currently uses the A83/A10, this adds 25 km to the journey (Sainte-Hermine à Saintes RN137 & A837 autoroute).

The A831, will connect Rochefort (A837) with Fontenay-le-Comte (A83). The route between Nantes and Bordeaux will be via A83 between Nantes and Fontenay-le-Comte, the A831 between Fontenay-le-Comte and Rochefort, the A837 between Rochefort and Saintes and the A10 between Saintes and Bordeaux. In spite of the many different motorways involved the route will be shorter.

A831 is currently only a proposal declared by a Public Utility Decree by the State Council on July 12, 2005. The next stage is the awarding of the concession to run the motorway. The road will however have to cross the Poitevin Marsh and Rochefort Marshes, the two great wetlands of the Atlantic Coast, which probably be challenged.

External links  
 A83 Motorway in Saratlas

A83